Gateway is the debut album by Gateway, a trio composed of John Abercrombie, Dave Holland and Jack DeJohnette. It was recorded in 1975 and released on the ECM label in 1976.

Reception 
The Penguin Guide to Jazz called it a "reflective album, but it is by no means sombre" stating "Abercrombie seems to like the open rhythmic weave and plays acoustically with great confidence and finely controlled timbre and dynamics. Holland is by no means playing at his best but he is incapable of mere journeywork and asserts his presence in the harmonic transitions in a way that more than makes up for the absence of keyboards" The Allmusic review by Scott Yanow states "The interplay between the three musicians is quite impressive although listeners might find some of the music to be quite unsettling. It takes several listens for one to digest all that is going on, but it is worth the struggle".

Track listing
 "Back-Woods Song (Dave Holland) – 7:51
 "Waiting" (Holland) – 2:10
 "May Dance" (Holland) – 11:01
 "Unshielded Desire" (Jack DeJohnette, John Abercrombie) – 4:49
 "Jamala" (Holland) – 4:47
 "Sorcery I" (DeJohnette) – 10:56

Personnel 
 John Abercrombie – guitar
 Dave Holland : bass
 Jack DeJohnette – drums

References 

Gateway (band) albums
1976 debut albums
ECM Records albums
Albums produced by Manfred Eicher